The Pickleville Playhouse is a musical theater on the banks of Bear Lake in Garden City, Utah, United States. LeGrande and Betty Larsen founded the Playhouse following their vision of creating a family-friendly theater that would serve as a place to bring generations together.

When the Larsens moved to Driggs, Idaho where LeGrande began his practice as a physician, they discovered an old melodrama theater, "Pierre's Playhouse", in nearby Victor, Idaho. After moving to Logan, Utah in 1976, the Larsens built their own melodrama theater.

The Pickleville Playhouse was named for the town in which it once resided, Pickelville. Shortly after the construction of the Playhouse, the town Pickelville was annexed as part of Garden City.

Construction
Playhouse construction began in June 1977. Despite never having constructed a large building before, LeGrande and Betty Larsen, with the help of their six sons and one daughter, acquired as much help as they could from experts and did the rest on their own. They peeled white pine logs by hand and mixed concrete in wheelbarrows. The seats were brought from the old Capitol Theatre in Salt Lake City which was undergoing renovation at the time. Because the Larsens weren't allowed to collect the seats until the workers at the Capitol had gone home, the family drove two hours in the middle of the night to the theater in Salt Lake, loaded up as many chairs as would fit in a truck, returned to Bear Lake, and repeated the process until all 320 chairs were moved. The seats are still in use today.

The family built by day and rehearsed on stage at night. There was no place for the cast and crew to stay, so they spent nights in sleeping bags and tents. The Larsens had to work quickly as they were scheduled to open their first show in August, two-and-a-half months after construction began.

Growth and expansion
Early audiences were meager. As the theater's reputation grew, however, so did the audiences. The Playhouse now performs for sold-out audiences from mid-June to early September with up to 13 shows per week. Pickleville has expanded its repertoire of summer melodramas to include favorite Broadway shows and, in December, takes its cast to Logan and Salt Lake City, Utah, where they perform an original Pickleville Christmas production.  Touring shows usually fly under the banner of "Pickleville On Tour"

Management
The Larsens transferred ownership of the theater and its operations to their youngest child (and only daughter), Andrea Larsen Davis. After a childhood spent at the theater and years of study, Andrea's oldest son, TJ Davis, joined her as a full-time partner and writer for the Playhouse. TJ now writes both scripts and scores for both the summer melodramas and the annual Christmas shows.  Younger brother Derek has written some recent summer productions.

Juanito Bandito 
The Playhouse has gained notability in recent years for the creation of a character, Juanito Bandito, an "unabashed, Spanglish-speaking, likeable crook".  Both created and played by T.J. Davis, the self-proclaimed "baddest Spanish villain in history" appeared first in "Chuck Wagon's Wild West Showdown" in the summer of 2008 at the Pickleville Playhouse. The character became the subject of the next seven consecutive summers' shows including: "The Hanging of El Bandito" (2009), "Bandito Rides Again" (2010), and "Who Shot Juanito Bandito?" (2011), "Ready, Fire, Aim starring Juanito Bandito" all of which were written by T.J. Davis.

Performances
In August 1977, the Playhouse performed its first melodrama, "The Faithful Footman".  It performs two shows each summer, one melodrama, and one Broadway show.

References

External links 
 Pickleville Playhouse Homepage
 Pickleville On Tour Homepage
 www.juanitobandito.com

Theatres in Utah
Tourist attractions in Rich County, Utah
1977 establishments in Utah